"Girlfriend" is a pop and hip hop song by American boy band NSYNC. It was released on March 12, 2002, as the third and final single from their third studio album Celebrity. It was the group's last song to enter the top 10 of the US Billboard Hot 100, peaking at number five. "Girlfriend" additionally reached number one in Canada and charted within the top 10 in six other countries, including Australia, Germany, and the United Kingdom. This was the last single the band released in their career.

Background
When originally announced as a single, the intention was for the album version of the track to be released along with a video and released to television. However, just weeks before the release, the group announced that the Neptunes would remix the song for its single release and feature two all-new verses with rapper Nelly. When Nelly was approached to record the song, he was initially met with resistance from his record label, who stated that he was trying to "ruin [his] career". Nelly insisted on appearing on the song, which they eventually conceded. It was his first major cross-collaboration.

The song contained a hip hop influence and was released on March 12, 2002, as an enhanced CD.

Critical reception
In 2015, Billboards  Jason Lipshutz ranked it tenth on the list "Top 20 Essential Boy Band Songs," writing, "straddling the lines of pop, R&B and hip-hop, the song could have been the precursor to the boy band's stylistic shift, but instead proved to be the starting point for Justin Timberlake's solo career."

Music video

Background
Two music videos exist for the single, which were both directed by Marc Klasfeld. The first video was released in late December 2001, while the Neptunes Remix debuted on March 12, 2002.

Synopsis
The music video featured the band dancing on cars, singing to girls and a drag race, which was won by Justin Timberlake. The Neptunes Remix featured scenes of Nelly spliced between shots of the pre-existing video. He is shown rapping next to Timberlake during both of his rap verses, as well as interacting with female models in the backseat of the car throughout this version of the video. Scenes of Timberlake initiating the drag race in the interlude, which is shown in the original video, are heavily omitted in the Neptunes Remix to accommodate for Nelly's rap verse, which his second rap verse replaces.

Track listings

US and Canadian CD single
 "Girlfriend" (album version) – 4:13
 "Girlfriend" (the Neptunes remix featuring Nelly) – 4:43
 "Gone" (Gone Clubbin' "I'll Be Back Late" mix) – 5:57
 "Gone" (Spanish version) – 4:51
 "Girlfriend" (video)

US 12-inch single
A1. "Girlfriend" (the Neptunes remix featuring Nelly) – 4:43
A2. "Girlfriend" (the Neptunes remix instrumental) – 4:43
B1. "Girlfriend" (album version) – 4:13
B2. "Gone" (Gone Clubbin' "I'll Be Back Late" mix) – 5:57

UK CD and cassette single
 "Girlfriend" (the Neptunes remix featuring Nelly)
 "The Two of Us"
 "Gone" (Gone Clubbin' radio edit)

European CD single
 "Girlfriend" (the Neptunes remix featuring Nelly) – 4:43
 "Girlfriend" (album version) – 4:13

Australian CD single
 "Girlfriend" (the Neptunes remix featuring Nelly) – 4:45
 "Girlfriend" (album version) – 4:14
 "Gone" (Gone Clubbin' "I'll Be Late" mix) – 5:59
 "Girlfriend" (video)

Japanese CD single
 "Girlfriend" (album version) – 4:13
 "Girlfriend" (instrumental) – 4:12
 "Gone" (Gone Clubbin' "I'll Be Late" mix) – 5:58

Credits and personnel
Credits are lifted from the UK CD single liner notes.

Recording
 Recorded at Right Track, NYC; Battery Studios, NYC; and WIRE Studios, Orlando, FL

Personnel
 Justin Timberlake – songwriter
 Chad Hugo – songwriter, producer, remix producer
 Pharrell Williams – songwriter, producer, remix producer
 The Neptunes – producer, remix producer
 Brian Garten – recording, additional vocal recording
 Paul Gregory – assistant recording engineer
 Rowie Nameri – assistant recording engineer
 Matina Scarpino – assistant recording engineer
 Jean-Marie Horvat – mixing
 Josean Possey – assistant mixing engineer
 Chaz Harper – mastering

Charts

Weekly charts

Year-end charts

Certifications

Release history

References

2001 songs
2002 singles
Canadian Singles Chart number-one singles
Jive Records singles
Music videos directed by Marc Klasfeld
Nelly songs
NSYNC songs
Song recordings produced by the Neptunes
Songs written by Chad Hugo
Songs written by Justin Timberlake
Songs written by Pharrell Williams
UK Independent Singles Chart number-one singles